Frédéric Alfred Marzolff (1867-1936) was a French sculptor and medallist, known especially for his monumental figures.

Biography
His father was a master cooper. He completed an apprenticeship with the sculptor and designer, who was engaged in restoring some of the monuments that had been destroyed or damaged during the Franco-Prussian War.

He continued his studies in Munich with Wilhelm von Rümann. While there, he also began a lifelong professional friendship with Adolf von Hildebrand. Upon returning to Strasbourg, the École supérieur, his alma mater, hired him as a modelling teacher.

In 1891, he began exhibiting locally. In 1893, he received a first prize at the Salon for his bronze sculpture, "L'Archer".

He would remain there for ten years; operating three workshops and producing monumental sculptures, as well as bronze busts and medallions. Returning to Strasbourg in 1911, he worked there until the outbreak of World War I, when he relocated to Rountzenheim.

After the war, his studio was flooded with orders for war memorials. In 1931, he was decorated with the Ordre des Palmes académiques.

Many of his works may still be seen around his native city; some were, however, destroyed during the German occupation of France during World War II.

Sources
"Alfred Marzolff (1867-1936), sculpteur et médailleur" (Les Amis de la Léonardsau et du Cercle de Saint-Léonard)

Further reading
 Audrey Dufournet, Alfred Marzolff (1867-1936) : un sculpteur alsacien de l'Art Nouveau, Christine Peltre (Ed.) Université de Strasbourg, 1997 
 François Joseph Fuchs, "Frédéric Alfred Marzolff", In: Nouveau Dictionnaire de biographie alsacienne, Fédération des sociétés d'histoire et d'archéologie d'Alsace, Strasbourg, vol. 26, p. 2546.
 Pierre Perny, A. Marzolff, le sculpteur de Rountzenheim (1867-1936), sa vie, son œuvre, Société d'histoire et d'archéologie du Ried Nord, 1986, pps.13-41

External links

 Alfred Marzolff @ Art Nouveau Artist Menu

Artists from Strasbourg
1867 births
1936 deaths
20th-century French sculptors
19th-century French sculptors
French male sculptors
19th-century French male artists